Samuel Bullock (1807 – 1855) was an English professional cricketer who played first-class cricket from 1825 to 1827 for Cambridge Town Club.  He made three known appearances in first-class matches.

References

1807 births
1855 deaths
English cricketers
English cricketers of 1787 to 1825
English cricketers of 1826 to 1863
Cambridge Town Club cricketers